The Democratic People's Republic of Korea Football Association (PRKFA) is the governing body of football in North Korea.

The association was founded in 1945 and it joined FIFA in June 1958 and the Asian Football Confederation (AFC) in September 1974.

Organization
PRKFA is "notoriously hard to contact". The association used to have a single fax number, and nowadays hosts a single email address. FIFA executive Jérôme Champagne remembers: "You sent a fax. Sometimes you got a reply", while football journalist James Piotr Montague's emails for "the best part of a decade" were always left unanswered. Even FIFA does not know for certain what the league system overseen by the PRKFA is like and what teams play in it.

League structure
The DPR Korea Football League is structured as follows (from highest to lowest):
DPR Korea Premier Football League
DPR Korea League 2
Amateur DPR Korea League 3

Senior management
, FIFA's website and the AFC's website list Mun Jae-chol as the association's president; he is also mentioned as such in a report published in November 2008.

Earlier presidents apparently include Choe Nam-gyun, listed on the FIFA website from July 2007 until at least July 2008, and in an overview of leading positions in the state (as of ?2009) on the website DPRK Search, with “September 2006” in brackets behind his name, and Rim Kyong-man, listed as president on FIFA's website until June 2007.

The Secretary General is Kim Jang-san.

References

External links
 North Korea at the FIFA website.
 North Korea at the AFC website.

Football in North Korea
North Korea
Foot
Sports organizations established in 1945
1945 establishments in Korea